Irene Below (born 1942) is a German woman art historian.

Life 
Below studied in Munich, Cologne and Berlin. From 1964 to 1967 she was a German Academic Exchange Service scholarship holder for Florence and was awarded a doctorate in 1971 with a dissertation on Leonardo da Vinci and Filippino Lippi. As early as 1972, at a congress of the Association of German Art Historians in Constance, Below suggested that the question of women in art history should be considered and thus initiated a discussion on the feminist perspective in art history. From 1974 to 2004, Below taught at the Bielefeld University, since 2007 as a lecturer at the University of Bielefeld in the Department of Art and Music. This is accompanied by freelance work as a curator and journalist. From 1995 until 1999, she undertook research trips to South Africa. In 2000, she was a founding member of frauenkunstforum-owl e.

In 1998, Below became involved against the name Richard Kaselowsky for the Kunsthalle Bielefeld, which is why the then director Thomas Kellein turned to the school board for support against this "teacher gone wild"..

She was and is involved in many socio-political activities; in the 1980s she was co-founder of a self-managed day-care centre with alternative pedagogy, and in 2017 of the self-help initiative "Wir für uns-anders Altern".

Below is married and has two sons. She lives in Werther near Bielefeld in North Rhine-Westphalia.

Main areas of work 
Her work focuses on the settlement of architecture of the 1920s, feminist art and cultural studies, female artists of the 20th and 21st centuries, periphery and centre in art, the art world and science, and studies on the exile of artists and scientists.

Publications 
 Die schönen Zeiten sind vorbei. Die schönen Zeiten hat es nie gegeben. Politische Kultur von unten in einer Reforminstitution – Irene Below (author), Peter Fuchs (writer), Frankfurt, 1986 
 Es gab nicht nur das Bauhaus: Below (writer) Bauhaus Dessau Foundation, 1994 
 Gisela Wölbing/Gertrud van Dyck: Historische Museen: Schriften der Historischen Museen der Stadt Bielefeld 8. Irene Below, Jörg Boström, Jutta Hülsewieg-Johnen, Gottfried Jäger, Rosa Schumacher, Sybille Seiger. Westfalen Verlag, 1996 
 Irma Stern and the Expressionism. Afrika und Europa. Irene Below (writer), Jutta Hülsewig-Johnen (writer) Christof Kerber Verlag, 1998 
 Hidden treasures, Irma Stern, Irene Below: Society of Bibliophiles in Cape Town, 2000 
 Die Vorteile des Künstlerinnendaseins: Susanne Albrecht (author), Irene Below (author), Angela Kahre (author) Interdisziplinäres Zentrum für Frauen- und Geschlechterforschung (IFF), 2001 
 eins und doppelt: Irene Below (foreword), Joachim Bünemann (foreword), Stefanie Lux-Althoff (collaboration) Landesverband Lippe, 2001 
 Christel Linkerhägner: Irene Below (publisher), Christa Niestrath (publisher), Tanja Kämmer (foreword), Christel Linkerhägner (Fotografin) frauenkunstforum-owl, 2004 
 Feministische Interventionen: Die Ausstellung Frauenalltag und Frauenbewegung 1890–1980 in Historischen Museum Frankfurt. In Annegret Friedrich (ed.): Die Freiheit der Anderen. Festschrift for Viktoria Schmidt-Linsenhoff. Marburg 2004, .
 Kulturelle Hierarchien in der Kunst (pädagogik)? In Johannes Kirschenmann, Rainer Wenrich, Wolfgang Zacharias (ed.): Kunstpädagogisches Generationengespräch. Zukunft braucht Soziale Herkunft. Munich 2004, .
 Below with Susanne Albrecht: Marmor, Stein und andere Stoffe–eine gelungene Kooperation und deren Voraussetzungen. Shortcut in Soft Logics in der Kunstvermittlung, Künstlerhaus Stuttgart, 2004
 Irene Below with Beatrice von Bismarck: Globalisierung /Hierarchisierung: Kulturelle Dominanzen in Kunst und Kunstgeschichte, 2004, 
 Globalization/Hierarchy. Irene Below (writer), Beatrice von Bismarck (writer). Jonas Verlag, 2004 
 With Ayşe and Ariane im Hamam – Zeitgenössische Kunst und interkulturelles Lernen in der Kunstpädagogik. In: Welt-Kunst-Pädagogik. Kunstvermittlung zwischen westlichen Kunst-Konzepten und globalen Fragestellungen. Loccumer Protokolle, Loccum 2005
 Gegen die Norm. Susanne Lüftners künstlerische Strategien. In Susanne Lüftner. Werkschau 1978–2004, Dortmund 2005, .
 Below with Melanie Blank: Helene Homilius (* 1910)–eine fast vergessene Künstlerin aus Hörste/Halle i. Westf. In: Heimat-Jahrbuch Kreis Gütersloh, Gütersloh 2005, .
 Susanne Lüftner: Werkschau 1973–2004 Silvia Liebig (designer), Michael Odenwaller (Designer), Susanne Lüftner (illustrator), Evan von der Dunk (translator), Irene Below (writer), Gabriele Oberreuter (writer). Kunst-Praxis Soest, 2005 
 Jene widersinnige Leichtigkeit der Innovation Hanna Deinhard's Wissenschaftskritik, Kunstsoziologie und Kunstvermittlung. In Ursula Hudson–Wiedenmann, Beate Schmeichel-Falkenberg (ed.): Grenzen Überschreiten. Frauen, Kunst und Exil, Würzburg 2005. . And in kunststoff–Zeitschrift für Kunst und Wissenschaft 3/2005
 Zwischen den Kulturen. Umgababa – Irma Sterns erstes Reisebuch. In Theresa Georgen, Carola Muysers: Bühnen des Selbst. Zur Autobiographie in den Künsten des 20. und 21. Jahrhunderts. Reihe Gestalt und Diskurs,  in Kiel 2006, .
 Lucy von Jacobi – Journalistin. Konzeption und Redaktion: Rolf Aurich, Wolfgang Jacobsen, Irene Below, Ruth Oelze. Film & Schrift, vol. 9, edition text & kritik, Munich 2009. 
 Below: Behinderte Karrieren im Umbruch der Zeit: Benita Koch-Otte (1892–1976). In Inge Hansen-Schaberg, Wolfgang Thöner and Adriane Feustel (ed.): Entfernt: Frauen des Bauhauses während der NS-Zeit–Verfolgung und Exil. edition text + kritik, Automn 2012
 Friedrich Meschede, Jutta Huelsewig-Johnen, with texts among others by Irene Below: 'To open eyes: Kunst und Textil vom Bauhaus bis heute', 2013, 
 Below, Inge Hansen-Schaberg, Maria Kublitz-Kramer (ed.): Das Ende des Exils?: Briefe von Frauen nach 1945 (Frauen und Exil), 2014, 
 Below, Burcu Dogramaci (ed.): Kunst und Gesellschaft zwischen den Kulturen: Die Kunsthistorikerin Hanna Levy-Deinhard im Exil und ihre Aktualität heute (Frauen und Exil), 2016,

References

External links 
 
 

German art historians
Gender studies academics
German women writers
1942 births
Living people
German women historians